Horst Deichfuß (11 April 1925 – 6 October 1989) was a German writer.

Life 
Born in Halberstadt, In 1943 Deichfuß was drafted for military service and in 1945/46 was a US-American or British prisoner of war.

After his return from captivity in 1947 he passed the Abitur. He then worked as a mailman for the Deutsche Post der DDR. In 1948 he joined the Socialist Unity Party of Germany. In 1955 he founded a cultural group at the Deutsche Post in Halle. In 1961 he completed a correspondence course in postal economics at the engineering school "Rosa Luxemburg" in Leipzig.

From 1963 to 1965 Deichfuß studied at the German Institute for Literature in Leipzig. In 1965/66 he was a lecturer for theatre and literature at the Halle City Council. From 1966 to 1969 he was the district secretary of the Writers' Association Halle. From 1969 he was active as a freelance author.

Deichfuß died in Halle after a short severe illness at the age of 64.

Work 
 Serpentinen (novel). , Halle (Saale) 1962.
 Anna Mater. Drei Frauenschicksale (tales). List, Leipzig 1971.
 Die Nagelprobe (novel). List, Leipzig 1974.
 Wiederaufnahme (novel). List, Leipzig 1977
 Windmacher (novel). List, Leipzig 1983.
 Rumänische Rhapsodie. Literarische Skizzen. Verlag der Nation, Berlin 1987.

References

Further reading 
 Kurt Böttcher (editor): Meyers Taschenlexikon. Schriftsteller der DDR. Bibliographisches Institut, Leipzig 1974, . 
 Gabriele Baumgartner, Dieter Hebig (editor): Biographisches Handbuch der SBZ/DDR. 1945–1990. Volume 1: Abendroth – Lyr. K. G. Saur, Munich 1996, .
 Wilhelm Kosch et al. (editors): Deutsches Literatur-Lexikon. Das 20. Jahrhundert. Band 6: Deeg – Dürrenfeld. Walter de Gruyter, Berlin 2004, Sp. 25f.
 Rüdiger Bernhardt: Schreibende Arbeiter der DDR zwischen Arbeiter- und Gesellschaftskultur. In Dominique Herbet (editor): Culture ouvrière. Arbeiterkultur. Mutations d’une réalité complexe en Allemagne du XIXe au XXIe siècle. Presses universitaires du Septentrion, Villeneuve-d’Ascq 2011,  (zu Deichfuß, S. 125f.)

External links 
 
 Portrait

1925 births
1989 deaths
People from Halberstadt
20th-century German writers
Socialist Unity Party of Germany members
German prisoners of war in World War II